Pat Heung North is one of the 39 constituencies in the Yuen Long District of Hong Kong.

The constituency returns one district councillor to the Yuen Long District Council, with an election every four years.

Pat Heung North constituency is loosely based on northern part of Pat Heung with estimated population of 13,491.

Councillors represented

Election results

2010s

2000s

1990s

References

Pat Heung
Constituencies of Hong Kong
Constituencies of Yuen Long District Council
1999 establishments in Hong Kong
Constituencies established in 1999